Intracellular receptors are globular protein receptors located inside the cell rather than on its cell membrane. The word intracellular means "within or inside a cell". Molecules that cross a cell membrane to bind with a receptor are generally nonpolar and may be relatively small. These molecules are also known as ligands. Hormones that use intracellular receptors include thyroid, aldosterone, and steroid hormones.

Examples are the class of nuclear receptors located in the cell nucleus and cytoplasm and the IP3 receptor located on the endoplasmic reticulum. The ligands that bind to them are usually intracellular second messengers like inositol trisphosphate (IP3) and extracellular lipophilic hormones like steroid hormones. Some intracrine peptide hormones also have intracellular receptors.

Examples 

 transcription factors
 nuclear receptors
 other
 Sigma1 (neurosteroids)
 IP3 receptor (inositol triphosphate, IP3)

See also 
 Receptor
 Steroid hormone

References

External links 
 Nuclear Receptor journal homepage
 Nuclear receptor resource

 Nuclear receptor signalling atlas (NURSA, open-access journal)